"Shot by Both Sides" is a song written by Howard Devoto and Pete Shelley, and performed by the English post-punk band Magazine. It was released in January 1978 as the band's first single, reaching No. 41 on the UK Singles Chart and appearing, a few months later, on their debut album Real Life. The song has been cited as a seminal work of the post-punk genre, as well as a pop punk and new wave song.

By the time of the single's recording, Magazine consisted of only four members, as original keyboardist Bob Dickinson had left the band the previous year.

The cover artwork was designed by Malcolm Garrett, based on the 1886 work La Chimere regarda avec effroi toutes choses by Symbolist artist Odilon Redon (1840–1916).

Song 
The name of the song came from a political argument between Devoto and his girlfriend, in which his girlfriend said to him; "Oh, you'll end up shot by both sides".

The song originated in a riff that Pete Shelley came up with when Devoto was helping him with "some tentative Buzzcocks songs. He played the chord sequence and I was really impressed, said so, and he just gave them to me there and then."

An identical guitar riff was used in the song "Lipstick" by Devoto's former band Buzzcocks, released as a B-side in November 1978, for which Devoto received a co-writing credit.

Reception
The song was ranked at No. 9 among the top "Tracks of the Year" for 1978 by NME.

Personnel
 Howard Devoto – vocals
 John McGeoch – guitar
 Barry Adamson – bass
 Martin Jackson – drums

References

1978 debut singles
Magazine (band) songs
Songs written by Pete Shelley
Songs written by Howard Devoto
1978 songs
Virgin Records singles